This list shows the coats of arms of the municipalities in the district of Sächsische Schweiz-Osterzgebirge in the German federal state of  Saxony.

The following municipalities have no coat of arms:
 Lohmen
 Porschdorf
 Rosenthal-Bielatal

Coats of arms of the towns and municipalities

Coats of arms of formerly independent municipalities

Coats of arms of former districts 

Sachsische Schweiz-Osterzgebirge
Coats of arms 
Coat